The Tambov electoral district was a constituency created for the 1917 Russian Constituent Assembly election.

The electoral district covered the Tambov Governorate. 73% electoral participation was reported, as the SRs had a good mobilization capacity among the peasantry. In the Spassko-Kashminskaia canton, Morshansk uezd the SR local government banned the Bolshevik election campaign, alleging that the Bolsheviks were German spies.

Results

References

Electoral districts of the Russian Constituent Assembly election, 1917